Pamela Pezzutto (born 17 July 1981 in Sacile) is an Italian Paralympic athlete who has won three silver medals at Summer Paralympics.

Biography
As a result of an accident she is on a wheelchair.

See also
Italy at the 2008 Summer Paralympics
Italy at the 2012 Summer Paralympics

References

External links
 

1981 births
Italian female table tennis players
Table tennis players at the 2008 Summer Paralympics
Table tennis players at the 2012 Summer Paralympics
Paralympic table tennis players of Italy
Medalists at the 2008 Summer Paralympics
Medalists at the 2012 Summer Paralympics
Paralympic medalists in table tennis
Paralympic silver medalists for Italy
People with paraplegia
People from Sacile
Living people
Sportspeople from Friuli-Venezia Giulia